The olive-spotted hummingbird (Talaphorus chlorocercus)  is a species of hummingbird in the "emeralds", tribe Trochilini of subfamily Trochilinae. It is found in Brazil, Colombia, Ecuador, and Peru.

Taxonomy and systematics

The olive-spotted hummingbird was previously placed in the genus Leucippus. A molecular phylogenetic study published in 2014 found that Leucippus  was polyphyletic. To avoid the polyphyly the olive-spotted hummingbird was moved by most taxonomic systems to the resurrected genus Talaphorus. However, BirdLife International's Handbook of the Birds of the World retains it in Leucippus.

The olive-spotted hummingbird is the only member of its genus and has no subspecies.

Description

The sexes are assentially the same. The have a straight blackish bill; the female's is slightly longer than the male's. Adults have a bronze crown and neck and the rest of their upperparts are grayish green to bronze-green. Their throat is olive green that sometimes appears speckled with golden green and the rest of the underparts are whitish. Their tail is pale grayish green to olive green with grayish tips on the inner feathers and grayish outer webs to the others. The outer feathers also have a dark bar near the end. Juveniles are very similar but have more grayish brown underparts.

Distribution and habitat

The olive-spotted hummingbird is found along the upper Amazon River and its major tributaries in northwestern Brazil, eastern Ecuador, northeastern Peru, and extreme southeastern Colombia. It has habitat requirements unique among hummingbirds: It is found almost entirely on young river islands and sometimes on the adjacent "mainland" shore. It keeps to shrubby open woodland and early successional vegetation.

Behavior

Movement

The olive-spotted hummingbird is generally sedentary but makes some local dispersal.

Feeding

The olive-spotted hummingbird forages for nectar at flowering plants of at least 10 families. In addition to feeding on nectar it gleans insects from foliage.

Breeding

The olive-spotted hummingbird's breeding season is not known. It makes a cup nest of soft plant material and fibers bound with spiderweb with lichen on the outside. The female incubates the clutch of two eggs for 14 to 15 days and fledging occurs about 20 days after hatch.

Vocalization

The olive-spotted hummingbird's song is "a monotonous series of multisyllabic notes, e.g. 'cliCHEW cliCHEW cliCHEW...'" and its calls include "a sharp 'seek', a wiry 'seeuee', a rich chatter and a hard 'tcht'."

Status

The IUCN has assessed the olive-spotted hummingbird as being of Least Concern, though its population size and trend are unknown. No immediate threats have been identified. It is considered rare to fairly common at different points along the river system.

References

olive-spotted hummingbird
Birds of the Amazon Basin
Birds of the Ecuadorian Amazon
Birds of the Peruvian Amazon
olive-spotted hummingbird
Taxonomy articles created by Polbot
Taxobox binomials not recognized by IUCN